Luigi Cimnaghi (born 10 August 1940) is an Italian sports administrator and retired gymnast. He competed at the 1964 and 1968 Olympics in all artistic gymnastics events and finished in 4th and 12th place with the Italian team, respectively. His best individual result was 14th place on the parallel bars in 1964. He won gold medals with the Italian team at the 1963 and 1967 Mediterranean Games, as well as four individual medals in 1967: two silvers, on the parallel bars and vault, and two bronze medals, all-around and on the horizontal bar.

After retiring from competitions Cimnaghi worked as a sports administrator. As a member of the European Union of Gymnastics he oversaw international junior competitions from 1984 to 1989. In 1988 he served as the chef de mission with the Italian Paralympic Team at the Nagano Winter Olympics, and in 1999-2004 worked as the manager of the Stadio Olimpico in Rome. Cimnaghi was a member of the organizing committees of the 1981 European Men's Artistic Gymnastics Championships, 1998 FEI World Equestrian Games, 2006 Winter Olympics and 2009 Mediterranean Games.

References

1940 births
Living people
Gymnasts at the 1964 Summer Olympics
Gymnasts at the 1968 Summer Olympics
Olympic gymnasts of Italy
Italian male artistic gymnasts
Mediterranean Games medalists in gymnastics
Mediterranean Games gold medalists for Italy
Mediterranean Games silver medalists for Italy
Mediterranean Games bronze medalists for Italy
Competitors at the 1963 Mediterranean Games
Competitors at the 1967 Mediterranean Games
People from Meda
Sportspeople from the Province of Monza e Brianza